Cyme anaemica is a moth of the family Erebidae first described by George Hampson in 1911. It is found in Papua New Guinea.

References

Moths described in 1911
Nudariina
Moths of New Guinea